Pieter Corneliszoon Plockhoy (also Pieter Cornelisz Plockhoy van Zierikzee or Peter Cornelius van Zurick-zee; c. 1625, possibly in Zierikzee, Netherlands – c. 1664–1670, Lewes, Delaware) was a Dutch Mennonite and Collegiant utopist who founded a settlement in 1663 near Horekill (Lewes Creek) on the banks of Godyn's Bay (Delaware Bay), near present-day Lewes, Delaware. The settlement was destroyed within a year via an English raid.

Almost nothing is known of Plockhoy's childhood and early life, but it is reasonable to assume he came from Zeeland and had a Mennonite background. In the early 1660s he lived at Amsterdam, where he became associated with the struggle of the liberal Mennonites, who were influenced by Collegiantism and were led by Galenus Abrahamsz de Haan, against the conservative Mennonites.

Before embarking for the New World, Plockhoy unsuccessfully petitioned Oliver Cromwell in 1658 for support in establishing various ideal settlements in England. It's possible that he worked in the circle of the intellectual Samuel Hartlib, who was certainly aware of his utopian plans. Plockhoy published political pamphlets addressing contemporary social problems in 1658 and collaborated with Franciscus van den Enden in plans for founding a new society in New Netherland. Some contemporary writers that were critical of his views alleged that Plockhoy defended polygamy. Plockhoy moved back to the Netherlands in 1661. He entered into a contract with the Dutch government to create a settlement along the southern part of the Delaware River.

In 1663 Plockhoy and 41 settlers made their way to Delaware Bay and established their colony near the former Zwaanendael Colony, the site of present day Lewes, Delaware. Plockhoy and his followers, which included Otto Wolgast a later magistrate and early settler in the town, arrived onboard the Dutch ship Sint Jacob. It is not known whether he survived the 1664 English raid on his settlement, but he is generally thought to have died within a few years of that event. Plockhoy's wife, his blind son, Cornelis, and several of the other original colonists continued to live in Lewes. In 1694 a blind man named Cornelis Plockhoy moved to Germantown, Pennsylvania.  Although older sources usually identified this man as the aged Pieter Cornelisz Plockhoy, current writers generally agree that this was his son, Cornelis.

Literature
While resident in New Netherland, Plockhoy published the 1661 poem, 't Lof van Nuw-Nederland (1661; The Praise of New Netherlands: Spurring Verses to the Lovers of the Colony and Brothership to be established on the South River of New Netherland by Pieter Corneliszoon Plockhoy van Ziereckzee" (published in 1661).

During the late 19th century, Henry Cruse Murphy, the U.S. Minister to the Netherlands in The Hague, rediscovered the poems written by Plockhoy and other Dutch poets resident in New Netherland, and had them published with English translations in the same metre.

References

External links
Short Story about New Netherland [...] and Special Possibilities to Populate by Plockhoy

1625 births
17th-century deaths
17th-century American poets
17th-century Dutch poets
American poetry in immigrant languages
American people of Dutch descent
Dutch Mennonites
People of New Netherland
People from Zierikzee
Founders of utopian communities